The 2022 California State Treasurer election was held on November 8, 2022, to elect the State Treasurer of California. Incumbent Democratic treasurer Fiona Ma won re-election to a second term.

Candidates

Democratic Party

Declared
Fiona Ma, incumbent treasurer

Republican Party

Declared
Andrew Do, Orange County supervisor
Jack M. Guerrero, certified public accountant, Cudahy city councilman, and candidate for California State Treasurer in 2018

Peace and Freedom Party

Declared 
Meghann Adams, activist and local union president

Endorsements

Primary election

Results

General election

Polling

Results

Notes

See also
2022 California elections
2022 California gubernatorial election

References

External links
Official campaign websites
Fiona Ma (D) for State Treasurer
Jack M. Guerrero (R) for State Treasurer

State Treasurer

2022
California